The Lafayette Leopards men's lacrosse team represents Lafayette College in National Collegiate Athletic Association (NCAA) Division I college lacrosse. The program was created in 1926. Lafayette plays its home games at Fisher Stadium, which has a capacity of 13,162. The Leopards have competed in the Patriot League since its 1991 founding. Through 2020, the team has an all–time record of 278–690–1.

The Leopards own one of the historically oldest programs in NCAA Division I lacrosse. However, that pedigree has not transferred over to much on-field success. While fellow Patriot League opponents such as Army, Loyola, and Navy have had consistent success in the NCAA tournament, the Leopards are still seeking their first bid. Additionally, traditional rival Lehigh captured 11 pre-NCAA national titles and dominates the rivalry series 69–21–1, including wins in 24 of the last 26 meetings through 2019.

While not winning a league championship or earning an NCAA tournament berth, Lafayette has had several strings of successful seasons. Many came under the helm of coach Bill Lawson, who guided the program from 1972 to 2002. Lawson has the most wins in school history with 155 and managed three seasons with at 9 victories. Lawson also managed the three best league finishes in program history, finishing tied for second place in the Patriot League three straight times from 1991 to 1993. Since Lawson left the program, the Leopards have struggled in conference play, managing a .500 record or better only once. That season, 2010, also saw the highest finish in league play since 1993 with a tie for third place and a bid to their only Patriot League Tournament appearance, which ended with a semifinal loss to Navy. Since 2011, Lafayette has gone 4–64 in the Patriot League, having lost 23 consecutive games since an upset victory over Navy in 2017.

Season Results
The following is a list of Lafayette’s results by season since the institution of NCAA Division I in 1971:

{| class="wikitable"

|- align="center"

 

†NCAA canceled 2020 collegiate activities due to the Chinese virus.

See also
Lacrosse in Pennsylvania

External links

References